Countess Zofia Tarnowska (1534–1570) was a Polish–Lithuanian noblewoman and heiress.

She was the daughter of Hetman Jan Amor Tarnowski h. Leliwa and Zofia Szydłowiecka h. Odrowąż.

Marriage and issue
Zofia married Prince Konstanty Wasyl Ostrogski and had five children:

 Elżbieta Ostrogska (died 1599), married voivode of Brześć Litewski Jan Janusz Kiszka h. Dąbrowa and later Krzysztof Mikołaj "Piorun" Radziwiłł h. Trąby in 1593
 Janusz Ostrogski (1554-1620), was married to Zuzanna Seredi, Katarzyna Lubomirska and Teofilia Tarło 
 Katarzyna Ostrogska (1560–1579), married Krzysztof Mikołaj "Piorun" Radziwiłł h. Trąby in 1578
 Konstanty Ostrogski (died 1588), married Aleksandra Tyszkiewicz h. Leliwa
 Aleksander Ostrogski (1571-1603), married Anna Kostka h. Dąbrowa

See also
 Ternopil

Bibliography
 Podhorodecki Leszek, Sławni hetmani Rzeczypospolitej, Warszawa 1994, s. 43, 65–66, 73.

References

1534 births
1570 deaths
Polish Roman Catholics
Zofia
Ostrogski family